Bella Unión is a city in Uruguay.

Bella Union may also refer to:

Places
Bella Union, an airport in Bolivia

Brands and enterprises
 Bella Union, an independent record label
 Bella Unión Airport, an airstrip northeast of Santa Ana del Yacuma, Bolivia
 Bella Unión District, a district of Peru
 Bella Union Hotel, Los Angeles, California
 Bella Union Saloon, Deadwood, South Dakota
 A former saloon in the Barbary Coast district of San Francisco